Edin Dino Zonić is a Bosnian composer and conductor.

Biography 
Maestro Dino Zonić was born and raised in Sarajevo. He is the composer and conductor and director of many productions throughout Europe and the United States concert halls, festivals and theaters of Europe and the United States, including for Pope John Paul II, the Dalai Lama and US President Bill Clinton. He was named as Cultural Ambassador of Bosnia and Herzegovina.

During the war in 1993, Dino Zonić began to compose CIRCLE, his highly acclaimed majestic musical, which played for four years in sold-out concert halls in Europe and the United States such as: "Theatre an der Wien" Vienna-Austria; City of London Festival; "Irish Art Center" Broadway, New York; "Vatroslav Lisinski" Concert Hall, Zagreb, Croatia; "Schuster Performing Arts Center" Dayton, Ohio.

External links
Official website

Living people
Bosniaks of Bosnia and Herzegovina
Bosnia and Herzegovina musicians
Year of birth missing (living people)
Musicians from Sarajevo
Bosnia and Herzegovina composers